Zubkov is a rural locality (a khutor) in Mokovsky Selsoviet Rural Settlement, Kursky District, Kursk Oblast, Russia. Population:

Geography 
The khutor is located on the Mokva River (a right tributary of the Seym River basin), 85 km from the Russia–Ukraine border, 2 km south-west of Kursk, 1 km from the selsoviet center – 1st Mokva.

 Climate
Zubkov has a warm-summer humid continental climate (Dfb in the Köppen climate classification).

Transport 
Zubkov is located 2 km from the federal route  Crimea Highway (a part of the European route ), 5.5 km from the nearest railway station Ryshkovo (railway line Lgov I — Kursk).

The rural locality is situated 14 km from Kursk Vostochny Airport, 121 km from Belgorod International Airport and 216 km from Voronezh Peter the Great Airport.

References

Notes

Sources

Rural localities in Kursky District, Kursk Oblast